Da Kath & Kim Code is a 2005 Australian comedy telemovie of the television series Kath & Kim.

After three seasons of Kath & Kim (2002–2004), Gina Riley and Jane Turner initially planned to take 2005 off from television. But in July, they announced that they would be writing and filming a 90-minute telemovie. The telemovie screened in Australia and New Zealand in November and December 2005 respectively. The telemovie was sold to networks in the United Kingdom and the United States. It was the last Kath & Kim production shown on the ABC before it moved to the Seven Network for the 2007 season. The plot is a parody of the 2003 popular novel The Da Vinci Code by Dan Brown.

Plot
Kel and Kath return from The Da Vinci Code European tour and begin frantic preparations for Christmas. During the two weeks leading up to Christmas Day Kim discovers that Brett is once again having an affair, this time with his boss Kelly. Brett stays at "The Buckingham Motel". Kim eventually asks him back, but he is still conducting the affair. Sharon meets a man, Marriat, online and they become engaged. She is heart broken to later learn that he does not actually exist, but is just a blog. Kath and Kel become backup dancers for Michael Bublé at Carols by Candlelight, Melbourne. Kath's affection for him results in Kel letting out his "green eyed monster", with Kel punching Bublé in the middle of the performance. She tells him that he shouldn't bother going home as he wouldn't be welcome. Kel too goes to stay at "The Buckingham". Kath forgives Kel and he returns home for Christmas. Kath and Kel also receive strange messages from John Monk (Barry Humphries), the albino running Da Vinci Code tour, including one saying "44 Euros". John Monk visits their home. Kel thinks he has cracked the code and Monk is going to kill them, but he just wants to offer them a franchise. An epilogue shows Kath's first day as a tour guide on the Da Vinci Code 2 tour: G'day Leonardo.

Cast and characters

Main
 Jane Turner as Kath Day-Knight
 Gina Riley as Kim Craig
 Magda Szubanski as Sharon Strzelecki
 Glenn Robbins as Kel Knight
 Peter Rowsthorn as Brett Craig
 Barry Humphries as John Monk (special guest)

Special guests
Michael Bublé, Rove McManus, Rhonda Burchmore and The Wiggles appeared as themselves.

Ratings
The movie aired on November 27, 2005, and was the ABC's top rated program for 2005, achieving an average audience of 2.1 million and a peak audience of 2.4 million.

DVD release
Da Kath & Kim Code was released to DVD as a 2-disc set on December 1, 2005, and was bundled with Kath & Kim Live in London. The DVD was briefly discontinued and repackaged again on April 1, 2010.

Awards and nominations

References

External links

2005 television films
2005 films
Australian comedy television films
2005 comedy films
2000s English-language films